The meridian 146° east of Greenwich is a line of longitude that extends from the North Pole across the Arctic Ocean, Asia, the Pacific Ocean, Australasia, the Indian Ocean, the Southern Ocean, and Antarctica to the South Pole.

The 146th meridian east forms a great circle with the 34th meridian west.

From Pole to Pole
Starting at the North Pole and heading south to the South Pole, the 146th meridian east passes through:

{| class="wikitable plainrowheaders"
! scope="col" width="130" | Co-ordinates
! scope="col" width="140" | Country, territory or sea
! scope="col" | Notes
|-
| style="background:#b0e0e6;" | 
! scope="row" style="background:#b0e0e6;" | Arctic Ocean
| style="background:#b0e0e6;" |
|-valign="top"
| style="background:#b0e0e6;" | 
! scope="row" style="background:#b0e0e6;" | East Siberian Sea
| style="background:#b0e0e6;" | Passing just east of the island of Kotelny, Sakha Republic,  (at ) Passing just west of the island of New Siberia, Sakha Republic,  (at )
|-valign="top"
| 
! scope="row" | 
| Sakha Republic Magadan Oblast — from  Khabarovsk Krai — from  Magadan Oblast — from  Khabarovsk Krai — from 
|-
| style="background:#b0e0e6;" | 
! scope="row" style="background:#b0e0e6;" | Sea of Okhotsk
| style="background:#b0e0e6;" |
|-valign="top"
| 
! scope="row" | Kuril Islands
|-
| style="background:#b0e0e6;" | 
! scope="row" style="background:#b0e0e6;" | Pacific Ocean
| style="background:#b0e0e6;" |
|-valign="top"
| 
! scope="row" | Kuril Islands
|-valign="top"
| style="background:#b0e0e6;" | 
! scope="row" style="background:#b0e0e6;" | Pacific Ocean
| style="background:#b0e0e6;" | Passing just east of Pagan,  (at ) Passing just east of Alamagan,  (at ) Passing just east of Guguan,  (at ) Passing just east of Sarigan,  (at ) Passing just west of Farallon de Medinilla,  (at ) Passing just east of Saipan,  (at )
|-
| style="background:#b0e0e6;" | 
! scope="row" style="background:#b0e0e6;" | Bismarck Sea
| style="background:#b0e0e6;" |
|-valign="top"
| 
! scope="row" | 
| Karkar Island
|-
| style="background:#b0e0e6;" | 
! scope="row" style="background:#b0e0e6;" | Bismarck Sea
| style="background:#b0e0e6;" |
|-valign="top"
| 
! scope="row" | 
|
|-
| style="background:#b0e0e6;" | 
! scope="row" style="background:#b0e0e6;" | Coral Sea
| style="background:#b0e0e6;" |
|-
| 
! scope="row" | 
| Queensland — Fitzroy Island
|-
| style="background:#b0e0e6;" | 
! scope="row" style="background:#b0e0e6;" | Coral Sea
| style="background:#b0e0e6;" |
|-valign="top"
| 
! scope="row" | 
| Queensland New South Wales — from  Victoria — from 
|-
| style="background:#b0e0e6;" | 
! scope="row" style="background:#b0e0e6;" | Bass Strait
| style="background:#b0e0e6;" |
|-
| 
! scope="row" | 
| Tasmania
|-
| style="background:#b0e0e6;" | 
! scope="row" style="background:#b0e0e6;" | Indian Ocean
| style="background:#b0e0e6;" | Australian authorities consider this to be part of the Southern Ocean
|-
| style="background:#b0e0e6;" | 
! scope="row" style="background:#b0e0e6;" | Southern Ocean
| style="background:#b0e0e6;" |
|-
| 
! scope="row" | Antarctica
| Australian Antarctic Territory, claimed by 
|-
| style="background:#b0e0e6;" | 
! scope="row" style="background:#b0e0e6;" | Southern Ocean
| style="background:#b0e0e6;" |
|-
| 
! scope="row" | Antarctica
| Australian Antarctic Territory, claimed by 
|-
|}

See also
145th meridian east
147th meridian east

References

e146 meridian east